The Cross River (Gunflint Lake) is a river of Minnesota.

See also
Gunflint Lodge, beside Gunflint Lake and on the Gunflint Trail
Gunflint Range
List of rivers of Minnesota

References

Minnesota Watersheds
USGS Hydrologic Unit Map - State of Minnesota (1974)

Rivers of Minnesota